The Cannes Corporate Media & TV Awards is an international festival dedicated to corporate films, online media and TV productions, and takes place every October in Cannes, France. It is often referred to as one of the most important festivals in the corporate film industry. The first festival took place in 2010. The current Festival Director is Austrian businessman Alexander V. Kammel who is also the director of the International Committee of Tourism Film Festivals (ICTFF) and many other festivals.

The best corporate productions and international TV documentaries are rewarded with Dolphin Trophies in Gold and Silver. The Grand Prix is selected from all the Gold Dolphin winners. A total of 39 categories exists, and winners are selected by a new jury every year, often including Oscar- and Emmy-winners.

Categories 
The festival has a total number of 39 different categories, which are divided into five main groups: Corporate Films and Videos, TV Documentaries and Reports (short and long format), Online Media, Production Arts & Crafts and Students. The list of categories may be updated from year to year, in accordance with the audiovisual industry trends.

Awards 

In the last eight years of the Award's history, the winners were awarded Silver, Gold, Black or White Dolphin. The outstanding artworks were rewarded with the Silver and Gold Dolphins. The Production Art & Craft category winners received Black Dolphins. The Grand Prix – given to the best video of the festival – is a White Dolphin. The Grand Prix will be awarded to the films selected among the Gold Winners. From 2015, the festival has a new trophy for the best production company, the Blue Dolphin.

Grand Prix winners
 2018: Losing Mr Renton - Directed by Tracey O'Halloran / Media Zoo (United Kingdom)
 2017: The Heart of Trade - Directed by Malcolm Green (United Kingdom)
 2016: Jus des Idées - Directed by Sun Sheau Huei (Singapore) 
 2015: The Heartbeat of Switzerland - Directed by Stephan Usteri (Switzerland)
 2014: Das Leben braucht Mut - Directed by Tobias Fueter (Switzerland)
 2013: Barossa. Be Consumed - Directed by Jeffrey Darling (Australia)
 2012: A Day of Reflection - Produced by Conspiração Filmes (Brasil)
 2011: Interviews of STI Stars - Produced by McCann Paris (France)
 2010: A Timeless Mystery - Directed by Pieter-Rim de Kroon (Holland)

Notable Gold Dolphin winners 
 2016: David Attenborough's Life that glows - Directed by Joe Loncraine for BBC.
 2014: Tales From The Organ Trade - Directed by Ric Esther Bienstock for HBO.
 2013: The Resurrection Tomb Mystery - Directed by Simcha Jacobovici.
 2012: We are Maersk - Directed by Christoffer Boe.

Awards Gala 
The Awards Gala takes place in Cannes, France, every year in October. The evening before the Awards Ceremony, the winners from all over the world get together during the Welcome Party, on the beach of the InterContinental Carlton. The day of the Awards Ceremony begins with the Media Center, where all submitted videos can be seen. The main evening starts with the Welcome Champagne leading the Award Gala Dinner. The two-day event ends with the Dolphin Lounge open bar.

External links 
 Cannes Corporate Media & TV Awards

References

Cannes Film Festival
French film awards
Audiovisual art